John Charles Burleson  (August 21, 1909 – October 6, 1983) was an American football lineman  who played one season in the National Football League with the Portsmouth Spartans, Pittsburgh Pirates and Cincinnati Reds. He played college football at Southern Methodist University.

References

External links
Just Sports Stats

1909 births
1983 deaths
Players of American football from Texas
American football offensive linemen
SMU Mustangs football players
Portsmouth Spartans players
Pittsburgh Pirates (football) players
Cincinnati Reds (NFL) players
People from Albany, Texas